Leonard Wayne St. Jean (born October 27, 1941) is a former college and professional American football guard. In 1964, he joined the Boston Patriots of the American Football League (AFL). He played there for ten seasons and was a one-time AFL All-Star, and a member of the Patriots' All-1960s (AFL) Team.

Lennie was known as the "Boston Strong Boy" and started his career as a defensive end for the Boston Patriots in 1964.  He recorded 5.5 sacks and played on both sides of the line of scrimmage over the 1964–1965 seasons.  He was also used as a linebacker.

Lennie sacked Mickey Slaughter and Jacky Lee in the Patriots 39-10 rout of the Denver Broncos @ Bears Stadium on 10-04-64.  He sacked Don Trull in the Patriots 34–17 victory over the Houston Oilers @ Jeppesen Stadium on 11-19-64.

Lennie sacked Dick Wood "twice' in their 30–21 loss to the Oakland Raiders @ Frank Youell Field on 10-24-65.  Lennie shared in a sack of Joe Namath in the Boston Patriots 27–23 win over the New York Jets @ Shea Stadium on 11-28-65.

As a defensive end, Lennie recovered a fumble by Mike Taliaferro in the Patriots 35–14 loss to the New York Jets on 10-31-64.

Lennie played most of his career as on Offensive Guard and was recognized as an AFL All Star Guard in 1966.  He did play as an offensive tackle earlier in his career.

He recovered 3 offensive fumbles while playing for the Patriots and wore #60.  He recovered a fumble by Patriot QB's Don Trull, Mike Taliaferro & Jim Plunkett. 
  
Lennie was awarded the game ball for knocking many men down in the Patriots 26–7 loss to the Houston Oilers on 11-26-67.

He was the Right Guard of the New England Patriots over 1971–1973 seasons and played in 140 consecutive games.

The football MVP Award at Newberry High School is named the Len St. Jean award in his honor.

See also
Other American Football League players

References

1941 births
Living people
People from Newberry, Michigan
Players of American football from Michigan
American football offensive linemen
Northern Michigan Wildcats football players
Boston Patriots players
New England Patriots players
American Football League players
American Football League All-Star players